In banking, antedated refers to cheques which have been written by the drawer, and dated at some point in the past. In the United States antedated cheques are described in the Uniform Commercial Code's Article 3, Section 113.

See also

Post-dated cheque

References
3 UCC 113 from the Cornell Law Center's online version of the Uniform Commercial Code

Antedated
Banking terms